Little Falls Dam could refer to:

Little Falls Dam (Mississippi River), in Little Falls, Minnesota 
Little Falls Dam (Potomac River), in Potomac, Maryland